Asia University may refer to:
 Asia University (South Korea) (亞洲大學校), a private university located in Suwon, Gyunggi-do, South Korea
Asia University (Japan) (亜細亜大学), a private university located in Musashino, Tokyo, Japan
Asia University (Taiwan) (亞洲大學)
Asia LIFE University, also known as Gospel Theological Seminary in Daejeon, Korea
Asia Pacific University
Asia e University, a multinational university in Malaysia